Aurélie Coulaud (born 5 May 1979 in Le Chambon-Feugerolles) is a French athlete specializing in the middle-distance running.

She won the national title in the 800 metres at the French Athletics Championships in 2002, and also two indoor national titles over 1500 metres in 2002 and 2003.

Coulaud is the sister of Julie Coulaud, another well known French middle distance runner.

National titles
 French Athletics Championships
800 m: 2002
 French Indoor Athletics Championships
1500 m: 2002, 2003

Personal bests

References

External links
 Biography on the French Athletics Federation website
 

1979 births
Living people
Sportspeople from Loire (department)
French female middle-distance runners